Aclistomycter is an extinct genus of oreodont.

Aclistomycter was a very small herbivorous artiodactyl with a short face, small, but tusk-like canine teeth.

Diagnosis
The type specimen consists of a skull and jaws. 

Generic characters assigned by Wilson (1970):
 Medium small merycoidodontid with very large and deep, probably perforated, antorbital fossae.
 Brachycephalic.
 Posterior part of skull extended.
 Molar teeth with thick enamel and deep fossettes.
 Posterior base of zygomatic processes wide, making the skull broad posteriorly.
 Bullae thought to be inflated (though the bullae are not exposed in the figures of the type specimen illustrated by Wilson).

Resources

 
Eocene even-toed ungulates
Eocene mammals of North America
Prehistoric even-toed ungulate genera